Twisted is a 2003 collection of short stories by crime writer Jeffery Deaver. The book was published by Simon & Schuster in 2003 and features 16 short stories, including one featuring Deaver's fictional detective Lincoln Rhyme.

Stories 

 Without Jonathan
 The Weekender
 For Services Rendered
 Beautiful
 The Fall Guy
 Eye To Eye
 Triangle
 All The World's A Stage
 Gone Fishing
 Nocturne
 Lesser-Included Offense
 The Blank Card
 The Christmas Present (an original Lincoln Rhyme story)
 Together
 The Widow of Pine Creek
 The Kneeling Soldier

More Twisted 

A second collection of stories entitled More Twisted was published in 2006 by Simon & Schuster. This collection contains fifteen previously published stories together with another new Lincoln Rhyme mystery.

References 

 Deaver, Jeffery: Twisted

External links 
 

2003 short story collections
Works by Jeffery Deaver
American short story collections
Crime short story collections